Education Without Borders (EwB), is a global non-profit organization established in 2002 in Vancouver, Canada. The vision of EwB is to empower at-risk children around the world by instilling a love of learning through educational opportunities. Its initial focus was Fezeka Secondary school in Guguletu, Cape Town, South Africa. 
Education without Borders provides educational opportunities for disadvantaged and at-risk children through initiatives in South Africa and Canada, including after-school support programs in Math, English, Science, school leadership and youth mentorship.

See also 

 Education Without Borders (Spanish organization)
 Education Without Borders (Sudan)

References

Organizations established in 2002
International educational organizations
Charities based in Canada